Gymnocalycium monvillei is a species of Gymnocalycium from Argentina.

References

External links
 
 

monvillei
Flora of Argentina